The Bar class were a class of boom defence vessels of the Royal Navy, Royal Australian Navy and South African Navy during World War II.

Ships

Royal Navy
 HMS Barbain (Z01) 
 HMS Barbarian (Z18) 
 HMS Barbastel (Z276) 
 HMS Barberry (Z257) 
 HMS Barbette (1937) (Sold to the Turkish Navy 3 March 1941)
 HMS Barbette (Z242) (Broken up October 1965 in Belgium)
 HMS Barbican (Z43) 
 HMS Barbour (Z169) 
 HMS Barbourne (Z170) 
 HMS Barbrake (Z173) (transferred to the South African Naval Forces in 1943)
 HMS Barbridge (Z222) 
 HMS Barbrook (Z03) 
 HMS Barcarole (Z287) 
 HMS Barcastle (Z09) 
 HMS Barcliff (Z70) 
 HMS Barclose (Z174) 
 HMS Barcock (Z177) 
 HMS Barcombe (Z16) 
 HMS Barcote (Z52) 
 HMS Barcroft (Z22) 
 HMS Bardell (Z195) 
 HMS Bardolf (Z171) 
 HMS Barfair (Z31) 
 HMS Barfield (Z42)

 HMS Barfoam (Z182) 
 HMS Barfoil (Z194) 
 HMS Barfoot (Z202) 
 HMS Barford (Z209) 
 HMS Barfoss (Z200) 
 HMS Barfount (Z190) 
 HMS Barglow (Z205) 
 HMS Barhill (Z225) 
 HMS Barholm (Z211) 
 HMS Barilla (Z17) 
 HMS Baritone (Z271) 
 HMS Barking (Z181) 
 HMS Barkis (Z277) 
 HMS Barlake (Z39) 
 HMS Barlane (Z48) 
 HMS Barleycorn (Z256) 
 HMS Barlight (Z57) (scuttled 19 December 1941, salvaged by IJN as Ma.101, after war to China) 
 HMS Barlow (Z60) 
 HMS Barmill (Z67) 
 HMS Barmond (Z232) 
 HMS Barmouth (Z77) 
 HMS Barnaby (Z237) 
 HMS Barnard (Z241) 
 HMS Barndale (Z92) 
 HMS Barneath (Z245) 
 HMS Barnehurst (Z84) 
 HMS Baron (Z262) 
 HMS Baronia (Z87) (built by Charles Hill & Sons) 
 HMS Barrage (Z54) 
 HMS Barranca (Z65) 
 HMS Barrhead (Z40) 
 HMS Barricade (Z83) 
 HMS Barrier (Z98) 
 HMS Barrington (Z59) 
 HMS Barrymore (Z73) 
 HMS Barsing (Z75) 
 HMS Barsound (Z89) 
 HMS Barspear (Z224) 
 HMS Barstoke (Z32) 
 HMS Barthorpe (Z95) 
 HMS Bartizan (Z261) 
 HMS Barwell (Z46) 
 HMS Barwind (Z58) 
 HMS Barcross (Z185), transferred to the South African Naval Forces in 1943.
 HMS Barflake (Z184) (lost 22 November 1943) 
 HMS Barnstone (Z37) 
 HMS Barova (Z94) (built by Charles Hill & Sons)

Royal Australian Navy

South African Navy

Surviving ships

  is a museum ship in South Africa
  is the only survivor on the RAN fleet in Homebush Bay as an abandoned wreck.

Citations and references

Citations

References
 http://uboat.net/allies/warships/class.html?ID=326
 http://uboat.net/allies/warships/class.html?ID=372&navy=HMS

World War II net laying ships
Auxiliary gateship classes
Boom defence vessels of the Royal Navy